James Boyle Uniacke (1799 – 26 March 1858) led the first responsible government in Canada as it is today or any colony of the British Empire. He  was the first Premier of the colony of Nova Scotia from 1848 to 1854 serving concurrently as the colony's Attorney-General.

The son of Richard John Uniacke, James was born to politics and entered the colony's legislative assembly in 1832 as a Conservative. In 1838 he joined the Executive Council and became a Reformer during the struggle for responsible government culminating in the 1848 election, the first under responsible government, which resulted in a Liberal Party administration led by Uniacke with Howe becoming more prominent after 1851 as Uniacke's health declined.

Uniacke worked closely with Joseph Howe, the most influential reform politician of the era and put Howe in his cabinet as Provincial Secretary. The two politicians worked to adapt Nova Scotia's institutions to the new democratic forms. Uniacke retired as Premier in 1854 to become commissioner of crown lands and surveyor general.

In 1832, Uniacke married Rosina Jane, the daughter of John Black.  Uniacke lived for years with Rosina in what is now known as the Black-Binney House, which is now a national historic site.

References

Biography at the Dictionary of Canadian Biography Online

Premiers of Nova Scotia
People from Halifax, Nova Scotia
Attorneys General of the Colony of Nova Scotia
Nova Scotia Liberal Party MLAs
1799 births
1858 deaths
Persons of National Historic Significance (Canada)
Colony of Nova Scotia people
Nova Scotia political party leaders